St. Ives  (released under the name All for Love in the UK) is a 1998 television film based on the unfinished Robert Louis Stevenson novel of the same name. The film stars Miranda Richardson, Anna Friel, Richard E. Grant and Jean-Marc Barr.

Plot
A dashing French Army officer, capitaine Jacques de Keroual de Saint-Yves, is captured by the British during the Napoleonic Wars and sent to a Scottish prison camp. There he falls for a local girl, befriends the commanding officer, and discovers a surprising secret about his long-lost grandfather.

Production
The film was shot in Northern Ireland.

Reception
DVDTalk gave it a rating of 1 out of 5, and said it "feels like a made-for-television special" and "I'm normally enthusiastic about historically-based movies, even flawed ones. St. Ives is more than flawed; it's dull and insipid."
The Radio Times gave it 2 out of 5. The Guardian said it was no classic, but asked does it matter "because costume drama is already the ultimate TV genre [...] it has always been able to demonstrate a reassuringly pantomime take on all other forms of television entertainment."

On Rotten Tomatoes the film has two reviews, both negative.

References

External links
 
 

1998 television films
1998 films
Films based on works by Robert Louis Stevenson
Films based on British novels
Films set in England
Napoleonic Wars films
1998 drama films
English-language French films
English-language German films
Films directed by Harry Hook